Outwood Academy Newbold (formerly Newbold Community School, and before that The Violet Markham and Newbold Green Schools pre-merger) is a mixed secondary school and sixth form located in Chesterfield in the English county of Derbyshire.

The school is operated by Outwood Grange Academies Trust, a multi-academy trust, and the current principal is Steven Roberts.

Facilities at the school include a sports hall, dance studio, drama studios, recording studio and all-weather sports facilities. The school also hosts the North East Derbyshire Music Centre.

History
Newbold Community School was previously split across two locations known as Upper Site and Lower Site, which previously consisted of Newbold Green School and Voliet Markham School respectively. The school relocated to a combined site and new building in 2006.

In November 2012, headteacher Jackie Overton was suspended, along with two other staff, for undisclosed reasons. Pupils were suspended for making 'malicious comments' regarding the incident after allegations were made that she had a sexual relationship with a student. Shortly afterwards, the school was placed in special measures under the ruling of an acting headteacher, Martin Ebbage.

In January 2015 the school converted to academy status and was renamed Outwood Academy Newbold. The school is now part of the Outwood Grange Family of Schools.

The school has broken the record for the highest number of exclusions locally.

Academics
Outwood Academy Newbold offers GCSEs, BTECs and OCR Nationals as programmes of study for pupils, while students in the sixth form have the option to study from a range of A Levels and further BTECs.

References

External links
 

Secondary schools in Derbyshire
Academies in Derbyshire
Newbold